Yue Xi Senior High school was founded in 1949, located in the southwest of Anhui province of China.

Now it is a provincial demonstration senior high school which is honored as Educational marvel in mountainous area, for its great contribution to the development of education and the modernization construction of the motherland.

High schools in Anhui